Scalptia is a genus of sea snails, marine gastropod mollusks in the family Cancellariidae, the nutmeg snails.

Species
Species within the genus Scalptia include:

 Scalptia aliguayensis Verhecken, 2008
 Scalptia androyensis Verhecken & Bozzetti, 2006
 Scalptia articularoides Verhecken, 1995
  † Scalptia atjehensis (Oostingh, 1938)
 Scalptia bicolor (Hinds, 1843)
 † Scalptia burdigalensis (Peyrot, 1928) 
 † Scalptia christiei (Finlay, 1924) 
 Scalptia contabulata (G.B. Sowerby I, 1832)
 Scalptia costifera (G. B. Sowerby I, 1832)
 Scalptia crenifera (G.B. Sowerby I, 1832)
 Scalptia crispa (G.B. Sowerby I, 1832)
 Scalptia crispatoides Verhecken, 2008
 Scalptia crossei (Semper, 1861)
 Scalptia delsaerdti Verhecken, 2020
 † Scalptia dertocosticillata (Sacco, 1894) 
 † Scalptia dertoparva (Sacco, 1894) †
 Scalptia foveolata (G.B. Sowerby II, 1849)
 Scalptia gorii Verhecken, 2020
 † Scalptia gradata (Hörnes, 1854) 
 Scalptia harmulensis Verhecken & Van Laethem, 2015
 † Scalptia haweraensis (Laws, 1940) 
 † Scalptia hidasensis (Hoernes & Auinger, 1890) 
 Scalptia hystrix (Reeve, 1856)
 † Scalptia kaiparaensis (Laws, 1939) 
 Scalptia laingensis Verhecken, 1989
 † Scalptia maoria (P. Marshall & Murdoch, 1921) 
 † Scalptia menadensis (Schepman, 1907) 
 Scalptia larissaensis Verhecken, 2020
 Scalptia mercadoi Old, 1968
 † Scalptia michelinii (Bellardi, 1841) 
 Scalptia nassa (Gmelin, 1791)
 † Scalptia nemethi Kovács & Vicián, 2021 
 † Scalptia neugeboreni (Hörnes, 1856) 
 Scalptia obliquata (Lamarck, 1822)
 † Scalptia polonica (Pusch, 1837) 
 † Scalptia problematica Landau, Harzhauser, İslamoğlu & da Silva, 2013 
 † Scalptia pukeuriensis (Finlay, 1930) 
 Scalptia rashafunensis Verhecken, 2020
 Scalptia richardi Verhecken & Van Laethem, 2015
 Scalptia scalariformis (Lamarck, 1822)
 Scalptia scalarina (Lamarck, 1822)
 Scalptia scalata (G.B. Sowerby I, 1832)
 † Scalptia scrobiculata (Hörnes, 1854) 
 Scalptia souverbiei (Crosse, 1868)
 † Scalptia spinosa (Grateloup, 1827) 
 † Scalptia tegalensis (Oostingh, 1938) 
 Scalptia tenuis (A. Adams, 1855)
 Scalptia textilis (Kiener, 1841)
 Scalptia vangoethemi Verhecken, 1995
 † Scalptia verheckeni Harzhauser, Raven & Landau, 2018 
 Scalptia verreauxii (Kiener, 1841)
 † Scalptia waikaiaensis (Finlay, 1924) 

Taxon inquirendum
 † Scalptia articularis (G. B. Sowerby I, 1832) 
Species brought into synonymy
 Scalptia lamberti (Souverbie, 1870): synonym of Trigonostoma lamberti (Souverbie in Souverbie & Montrouzier, 1870)
 Scalptia macconkeyi Jousseaume, 1894: synonym of Scalptia hystrix (Reeve, 1856)
 Scalptia nodosivaricosa (Petush, 1979): synonym of Nipponaphera nodosivaricosa (Petuch, 1979)
 Scalptia scala (Gmelin, 1791): synonym of Trigonostoma scala (Gmelin, 1791)
 Scalptia vinnulum (Iredale, 1925): synonym of Trigonaphera vinnulum (Iredale, 1925)

References

External links
 Jousseaume F.P. (1887). La famille Cancellariidae (Mollusques Gastéropodes). Le Naturaliste. ser. 2, 9(13): 155-157 [15 September 1887; 9(16): 192-194]
 Hemmen J. (2007) Recent Cancellariidae. Annotated and illustrated catalogue of Recent Cancellariidae. Privately published, Wiesbaden. 428 pp. [With amendments and corrections taken from Petit R.E. (2012) A critique of, and errata for, Recent Cancellariidae by Jens Hemmen, 2007. Conchologia Ingrata 9: 1-8

Cancellariidae
Gastropod genera
Taxa named by Félix Pierre Jousseaume